Williams House or Williams Farm may refer to:

United States
(by state, then city/town)

Arkansas
Arthur Williams Homestead, Feed Storage Shed, Bradford, Arkansas, listed on the National Register of Historic Places (NRHP) in White County
Maguire-Williams House, Elkins, Arkansas, listed on the NRHP in Arkansas
Williams-Wootton House, Hot Springs, Arkansas, listed on the NRHP in Arkansas
Dr. Robert George Williams House, Parkdale, Arkansas, NRHP-listed
Williams House and Associated Farmstead, St. Paul, Arkansas, listed on the NRHP in Arkansas
Williams House (Searcy, Arkansas), listed on the NRHP in Arkansas
Duckworth-Williams House, Siloam Springs, Arkansas, listed on the NRHP in Arkansas

Arizona
E. B. Williams House, Kingman, Arizona, NRHP-listed
Dan Williams House, Safford, Arizona, listed on the NRHP in Arizona

California
Roger Y. Williams House, San Juan Capistrano, California, listed on the NRHP in California

Connecticut
Austin F. Williams Carriagehouse and House, Farmington, Connecticut, NRHP-listed
William Williams House (Lebanon, Connecticut), Lebanon, Connecticut, a National Historic Landmark and NRHP-listed
Eleazer Williams House, Mansfield Center, Connecticut, NRHP-listed
Williams House, New Fairfield, Connecticut, NRHP-listed
Warham Williams House, Northford, Connecticut, listed on the NRHP in Connecticut
Williams and Stancliff Octagon Houses, Portland, Connecticut, NRHP-listed
Buttolph–Williams House, Wethersfield, Connecticut, NRHP-listed

Delaware
James Williams House, Kenton, Delaware, NRHP-listed
J. K. Williams House, Odessa, Delaware, NRHP-listed
Williams House (Odessa, Delaware), NRHP-listed

Florida
Williams House (Fort Lauderdale, Florida), NRHP-listed
John C. Williams House, St. Petersburg, Florida, NRHP-listed
Williams House (Tallahassee, Florida), NRHP-listed

Georgia
Williams-Moore-Hillsman House, Roberta, Georgia, listed on the NRHP in Georgia
Williams Family Farm, Villa Rica, Georgia, listed on the NRHP in Georgia

Illinois
James Robert Williams House, Carmi, Illinois, NRHP-listed
Daniel Hale Williams House, Chicago, Illinois, NRHP-listed
Daniel Hale Williams House, Chicago, Illinois, NRHP-listed
Silas Williams House, Streator, Illinois, NRHP-listed

Indiana
Samuel P. Williams House, Howe, Indiana, listed on the NRHP in Indiana
Williams-Warren-Zimmerman House, Terre Haute, Indiana, listed on the NRHP in Indiana

Iowa
Potter–Williams House (Davenport, Iowa), Davenport, Iowa, NRHP-listed

Kansas
M. D. L. Williams Barn, Bendena, Kansas, listed on the NRHP in Kansas

Kentucky
Eustace Williams House, Anchorage, Kentucky, listed on the NRHP in Kentucky
Smith–Williams House, Burgin, Kentucky, listed on the NRHP in Kentucky
Williams House (Harrodsburg, Kentucky), listed on the NRHP in Kentucky
Abraham L. Williams L & N Guest House, Lyndon, Kentucky, listed on the NRHP in Kentucky
Merritt Williams House, Midway, Kentucky, listed on the NRHP in Kentucky
Hubbard Williams House, Millersburg, Kentucky, listed on the NRHP in Kentucky
Williams House (Red Bush, Kentucky), listed on the NRHP in Kentucky
John Williams House (Shawhan, Kentucky), listed on the NRHP in Kentucky
Thomas H. Williams House, Springfield, Kentucky, listed on the NRHP in Kentucky
Daniel Motley Williams House, Summersville, Kentucky, listed on the NRHP in Kentucky

Louisiana
Williams House (Mansfield, Louisiana), listed on the NRHP in Louisiana
Isaacs–Williams Mansion, New Orleans, Louisiana, listed on the NRHP in Louisiana

Maine
Gen. John Williams House, Bangor, Maine, listed on the NRHP in Maine
John Williams House (Mount Vernon, Maine), listed on the NRHP in Maine
Timothy and Jane Williams House, Rockland, Maine, listed on the NRHP in Maine

Massachusetts
Deane-Williams House, Cambridge, Massachusetts, NRHP-listed
Peabody-Williams House, Newton, Massachusetts, NRHP-listed
Charles Williams House, Somerville, Massachusetts, NRHP-listed
Charles Williams Jr. House, Somerville, Massachusetts, NRHP-listed
F. G. Williams House, Somerville, Massachusetts, NRHP-listed
Micah Williams House, Stoneham, Massachusetts, NRHP-listed
Williams–Linscott House, Stoneham, Massachusetts, NRHP-listed
Fairbanks-Williams House, Taunton, Massachusetts, NRHP-listed
Abiathar King Williams House, Taunton, Massachusetts, NRHP-listed
Enoch Williams House, Taunton, Massachusetts, NRHP-listed
Francis D. Williams House, Taunton, Massachusetts, NRHP-listed
N. S. Williams House, Taunton, Massachusetts, NRHP-listed
N. Williams House, Uxbridge, Massachusetts, NRHP-listed

Michigan
Williams-Cole House, Durand, Michigan, listed on the NRHP in Michigan
Alfred Williams House, Owosso, Michigan, listed on the NRHP in Michigan
Benjamin Williams House, Owosso, Michigan, listed on the NRHP in Michigan

Minnesota
C. E. Williams House, Mora, Minnesota, listed on the NRHP in Minnesota

Mississippi
Ford–Williams House, Energy, Mississippi, listed on the NRHP in Mississippi
Jim Williams House, Enterprise, Mississippi, listed on the NRHP in Mississippi
Galloway-Williams House, Jackson, Mississippi, listed on the NRHP in Mississippi
Alex Williams House, Jackson, Mississippi, listed on the NRHP in Mississippi

Missouri
C. C. Williams House, Clinton, Missouri, listed on the NRHP in Henry County
John Siddle Williams House, Hermitage, Missouri, listed on the NRHP in Hickory County
Williams-Gierth House, Poplar Bluff, Missouri, listed on the NRHP in Butler County

Montana
Williams House (Stevensville, Montana), listed on the NRHP in Montana
John and Ann Williams House, Stevensville, Montana, listed on the NRHP in Montana

Nebraska
Royer-Williams House, Lincoln, Nebraska, listed on the NRHP in Nebraska
Thomas and Mary Williams Homestead, Taylor, Nebraska, NRHP-listed

New Jersey
Dr. Edward H. Williams House, Beach Haven, New Jersey, listed on the NRHP in New Jersey
Williams-Harrison House, Roseland, New Jersey, NRHP-listed
William Carlos Williams House, Rutherford, New Jersey, NRHP-listed

New York
John S. Williams House and Farm, Chatham, New York, NRHP-listed
Elisha Williams House, Hudson, New York, NRHP-listed
Henry Williams House (Huntington, New York), NRHP-listed
Potter–Williams House (Huntington, New York), NRHP-listed
Sherman Williams House and Fruit Barn, Jerusalem, New York, NRHP-listed
Dayton-Williams House, Middle Granville, New York, NRHP-listed
Williams–DuBois House, New Castle, New York, NRHP-listed
R. C. Williams Warehouse, New York, New York, NRHP-listed
Johann Williams Farm, Niagara Falls, New York, NRHP-listed
Post-Williams House, Poughkeepsie, New York, NRHP-listed
Williams Farm (Rhinebeck, New York), NRHP-listed
Greenridge-Arthur Williams House, Roslyn Harbor, New York, NRHP-listed
Williams House (Vassar College), town of Poughkeepsie, New York

North Carolina
Robert Williams House, Eastover, North Carolina, listed on the NRHP in North Carolina
Smith-Williams-Durham Boarding House, Hendersonville, North Carolina, listed on the NRHP in North Carolina
Williams, Jr., Solomon and Kate, House, Inez, North Carolina, listed on the NRHP in North Carolina
Humphrey–Williams House, Lumberton, North Carolina, NRHP-listed
Isaac Williams House, Newton Grove, North Carolina, listed on the NRHP in North Carolina
Williams–Powell House, Orrum, North Carolina, listed on the NRHP in North Carolina
Olzie Whitehead Williams House, Wilson, North Carolina, listed on the NRHP in North Carolina

North Dakota
Towne–Williams House, Bismarck, North Dakota, NRHP-listed

Ohio
Henry Harrison Williams House, Avon, Ohio, listed on the NRHP in Ohio
W. L. Williams House, Cincinnati, Ohio, NRHP-listed
Abner Williams Log House, Lashley, Ohio, NRHP-listed
Elias Williams House, Newark, Ohio, listed on the NRHP in Ohio
Dr. Issac Elmer Williams House and Office, St. Marys, Ohio, NRHP-listed
Judge Henry Williams House, Troy, Ohio, listed on the NRHP in Ohio
Williams House (Williamsburg, Ohio), listed on the NRHP in Ohio

Oregon
C. S. Williams House, Eugene, Oregon, listed on the NRHP in Oregon
George H. Williams Townhouses, Portland, Oregon, NRHP-listed
Cox–Williams House, St. Helens, Oregon
Bennett–Williams House, The Dalles, Oregon

Pennsylvania
Ellis Williams House, East Goshen, Pennsylvania, NRHP-listed
John Williams Farm, Phoenixville, Pennsylvania, NRHP-listed
John Williams House (Williams Grove, Pennsylvania), NRHP-listed

South Carolina
Williams–Ligon House, Easley, South Carolina, NRHP-listed
Williams–Earle House, Greenville, South Carolina, listed on the NRHP in South Carolina
Williams Place, Glenn Springs, South Carolina, listed on the NRHP in South Carolina
Williams-Ball-Copeland House, Laurens, South Carolina, NRHP-listed
Tom Williams House, Williams, South Carolina, NRHP-listed
Williams House (Ulmer, South Carolina), NRHP-listed

South Dakota
John and Kittie Williams House, Webster, South Dakota, listed on the NRHP in South Dakota

Tennessee
Colonel John Williams House, Knoxville, Tennessee, listed on the NRHP in Tennessee
Fite-Williams-Ligon House, Carthage, Tennessee, listed on the NRHP in Tennessee
Jordan–Williams House, Nolensville, Tennessee, NRHP-listed

Texas
W. T. and Clotilde V. Williams House, Austin, Texas, listed on the NRHP in Texas
McCanless–Williams House, Ennis, Texas, listed on the NRHP in Texas
Samuel May Williams House, Galveston, Texas, NRHP-listed
Williams–Brueder House, Houston, Texas, listed on the NRHP in Texas
Dial–Williamson House, Marshall, Texas, listed on the NRHP in Texas
Williams–Tarbutton House, San Marcos, Texas, listed on the NRHP in Texas
Williams–Anderson House, Tyler, Texas, listed on the NRHP in Texas
B. F. Williams House, Victoria, Texas, listed on the NRHP in Texas
Porter L. Williams House, Waxahachie, Texas, listed on the NRHP in Texas
Williams–Erwin House, Waxahachie, Texas, listed on the NRHP in Texas

Utah
Nathaniel J. Williams House, Park City, Utah, listed on the NRHP in Utah
Reese Williams House, Park City, Utah, listed on the NRHP in Utah

Virginia
Williams House (Richlands, Virginia), NRHP-listed
Williams–Brown House and Store, Salem, Virginia, NRHP-listed

Washington
Hattie Williams House, Irondale, Washington, listed on the NRHP in Washington
James and Corinne Williams House, Spokane, Washington, listed on the NRHP in Washington
Sidney Williams House, Sumner, Washington, listed on the NRHP in Washington
Herbert Williams House, Sumner, Washington, listed on the NRHP in Washington

Wisconsin
Lewis-Williams House, Hudson, Wisconsin, NRHP-listed
William G. and Anne Williams House, Sparta, Wisconsin, NRHP-listed
Frank J. Williams House, Whitefish Bay, Wisconsin, listed on the NRHP in Wisconsin

Australia
(by state, then city/town)

Queensland
Williams' House, Yungaburra, Yungaburra, Queensland, listed on the Queensland Heritage Register

See also
Henry Williams House (disambiguation)
James Williams House (disambiguation)
William Williams House (disambiguation)
McWilliams House (disambiguation)
Potter-Williams House (disambiguation)